The meridian 44° west of Greenwich is a line of longitude that extends from the North Pole across the Arctic Ocean, Greenland, the Atlantic Ocean, South America, the Southern Ocean, and Antarctica to the South Pole.

The 44th meridian west forms a great circle with the 136th meridian east.

From Pole to Pole
Starting at the North Pole and heading south to the South Pole, the 44th meridian west passes through:

{| class="wikitable plainrowheaders"
! scope="col" width="120" | Co-ordinates
! scope="col" | Country, territory or sea
! scope="col" | Notes
|-
| style="background:#b0e0e6;" | 
! scope="row" style="background:#b0e0e6;" | Arctic Ocean
| style="background:#b0e0e6;" |
|-
| style="background:#b0e0e6;" | 
! scope="row" style="background:#b0e0e6;" | Lincoln Sea
| style="background:#b0e0e6;" |
|-
| 
! scope="row" | 
|Nansen Land
|-
| style="background:#b0e0e6;" | 
! scope="row" style="background:#b0e0e6;" | J.P. Koch Fjord
| style="background:#b0e0e6;" |
|-
| 
! scope="row" | 
|Freuchen Land
|-
| style="background:#b0e0e6;" | 
! scope="row" style="background:#b0e0e6;" | Nordenskiöld Fjord
| style="background:#b0e0e6;" |
|-
| 
! scope="row" | 
| Mainland
|-
| style="background:#b0e0e6;" | 
! scope="row" style="background:#b0e0e6;" | Prince Christian Sound
| style="background:#b0e0e6;" |
|-
| 
! scope="row" | 
| Sammisoq and Egger Island
|-
| style="background:#b0e0e6;" | 
! scope="row" style="background:#b0e0e6;" | Atlantic Ocean
| style="background:#b0e0e6;" |
|-valign="top"
| 
! scope="row" | 
| Maranhão Piauí —  Bahia —  Minas Gerais — , passing just west of Belo Horizonte (at ) Rio de Janeiro — 
|-
| style="background:#b0e0e6;" | 
! scope="row" style="background:#b0e0e6;" | Sepetiba Bay
| style="background:#b0e0e6;" |
|-
| 
! scope="row" | 
| Rio de Janeiro — Restinga da Marambaia (sandbank) 
|-
| style="background:#b0e0e6;" | 
! scope="row" style="background:#b0e0e6;" | Atlantic Ocean
| style="background:#b0e0e6;" |
|-
| style="background:#b0e0e6;" | 
! scope="row" style="background:#b0e0e6;" | Southern Ocean
| style="background:#b0e0e6;" |
|-valign="top"
| 
! scope="row" | Antarctica
|-
|}

See also
43rd meridian west
45th meridian west

w044 meridian west